Chester Frazier (born April 14, 1986) is an American college basketball coach from Baltimore, Maryland currently serving as an assistant coach at the University of Illinois, his alma mater.

Playing career
Frazier played four seasons at the University of Illinois (2005–09), under head coach Bruce Weber, earning honorable mention All-Big Ten and Big Ten All-Defensive Team honors. He earned a bachelor's degree in recreation management from Illinois in 2009.

Coaching career
Frazier joined his former head coach Bruce Weber as an assistant in 2012 when Weber was announced as head coach of Kansas State University. He helped Kansas State make five NCAA Tournament appearances including a spot in the Elite Eight in 2018.

Frazier joined Virginia Tech in 2019 when Mike Young was announced as head coach of Virginia Tech.

In 2021, Frazier returned to the University of Illinois as an assistant coach.

References

External links
KSU Wildcat's Profile
Fighting Illini Coaching Profile
Fighting Illini Player Profile

1986 births
Living people
African-American basketball coaches
African-American basketball players
American expatriate basketball people in Germany
American men's basketball players
Basketball players from Baltimore
BG Göttingen players
Illinois Fighting Illini men's basketball coaches
Illinois Fighting Illini men's basketball players
Kansas State Wildcats men's basketball coaches
Point guards
S.Oliver Würzburg players
21st-century African-American sportspeople
20th-century African-American people